Live in Amsterdam is a live album by Beth Hart and Joe Bonamassa. It was recorded during a live performance at the music venue Carré Theatre in Amsterdam, the Netherlands. A DVD version is also available. The album peaked at No. 49 in the United Kingdom and at No. 13 in the Netherlands.

Track listing

CD 1

CD 2

DVD
"Amsterdam, Amsterdam!"
"Them There Eyes"
"Sinner's Prayer"
"Can't Let Go"
"For My Friends"
"Close to My Fire"
"Rhymes"
"Something's Got a Hold on Me"
"Your Heart Is As Black As Night"
"Chocolate Jesus"
"Baddest Blues"
"Someday After Awhile (You'll Be Sorry)"
"Beth introduces the band"
"Well, Well"
"If I Tell You I Love You"
"See Saw"
"Strange Fruit"
"Miss Lady"
"I Love You More Than You'll Ever Know"
"Nutbush City Limits"
"I'd Rather Go Blind"
"Antwerp Jam" and credits

Personnel
Musicians
 Beth Hart – vocals
 Joe Bonamassa – guitars
 Carmine Rojas – bass guitar
 Anton Fig – drums
 Blondie Chaplin – rhythm guitar
 Arlan Schierbaum – keyboards
 Lee Thornburg – brass instruments, brass arrangements
 Ron Dziubla – baritone saxophone
 Carlos Perez Alfonso – trombone

Production credits
 Kevin Shirley – producer
Marcus Bird – photography and direction

Certifications

References

2014 albums
Beth Hart albums
Joe Bonamassa albums
Covers albums
Collaborative albums